Amy Cragg (née Hastings; born January 21, 1984) is an American track and field athlete, specializing in long distance running events. She is the 2015 American champion in the Marathon, the 2012 American champion in the 10,000 meters, and a qualifier for the 2012 Summer Olympics.

Early career
Hastings went to high school at Leavenworth High School in Leavenworth, Kansas.  During her career, she captured three state titles on the track and won the state cross country championships.

She was an Arizona State University teammate of Desiree Davila, the qualifying second-place finisher in that same race.  Running for ASU, Hastings had been the 2005 NCAA Indoor Champion in the 5000 meters. Amy earned her first All-American honor at 2003 NCAA Women's Division I Cross Country Championship in 25th place. Hastings ranks as one of the all-time greats to pass through the ranks in the Maroon and Gold, earning seven All-America honors for track and field and three for cross country.  Her 10 total All-America honors rank her second in ASU history.  Hastings was the 2006 NCAA Champion at 5,000-meters NCAA Women's Division I Indoor Track and Field Championships.

International competition
Amy Hastings Cragg trained in Providence, Rhode Island, with Kim Smith and Molly Huddle under the guidance of Coach Ray Treacy until November 2015.

Sponsored by Brooks, 2011 was her breakthrough year. She knocked 34 seconds off her previous results in the 5000 meters, to become runner up at the 2011 USA Outdoor Track and Field Championships in 15:14.31. The results of that race also qualified her for the 2011 IAAF World Championships, where she qualified for the final.

2011 was also the year she tried her first marathon, at the Los Angeles Marathon. Her second-place finish in 2:27:03 made her the eighth fastest American.

In 2012, she finished in fourth place in the United States Marathon Olympic Trials. 

She won the 10,000 meters at the 2012 US Olympic Trials.  At the London 2012 Summer Olympics, Hastings was able to stay with the lead group of East Africans until the 18 minute mark before falling back to finish 11th in 31:10, roughly 50 seconds behind the gold medalist Tirunesh Dibaba.

In the 10,000 m at the 2013 World Championship in Moscow, Russia, Hastings finished 14th in 32:51.19. Hastings announced she will run New York Marathon in November and will focus on the distance in future world events. Hastings finished 20th in 2013 New York City Marathon in 2:42:50.

On July 4, 2014, Hastings won the Peachtree Road Race in Atlanta, GA with a time of 32:16. The race also served as the 10,000 meter National Championship.

On October 12 at the 2014 Chicago Marathon, Amy Hastings finished fifth in 2:27:03.

On March 14, 2015, Cragg won USA title by 32 seconds at USA Track and Field 15 km championship in Jacksonville, Florida, with a time of 50:18.

On June 25, 2015, Cragg finished 4th in 10,000 meters in 32:03.95 at 2015 USA Outdoor Track and Field Championships. On 7 September 2015, she placed 14th at USA 20K Championship during the New Haven Road Race in 1:11:22. On 13 February 2016, she placed first at the US Olympic Marathon Trials, finishing in 2:28:20 on a warm day in Los Angeles. On August 14, 2016, she placed 9th at Athletics at the 2016 Summer Olympics – Women's marathon in 2:28:25. On August 6, 2017, she placed 3rd at the 2017 World Championships in Athletics in London, United Kingdom, in 2:27:18.

Competition record

USA National Championships

Road

Track and Field

Cross country

NCAA championships

Outdoor Track and Field

Indoor track and field

Cross country

References

External links

1984 births
Living people
Sportspeople from Leavenworth, Kansas
Track and field athletes from Long Beach, California
Track and field athletes from Kansas
American female long-distance runners
American female marathon runners
Olympic track and field athletes of the United States
Athletes (track and field) at the 2012 Summer Olympics
Athletes (track and field) at the 2016 Summer Olympics
World Athletics Championships athletes for the United States
World Athletics Championships medalists
USA Outdoor Track and Field Championships winners
Arizona State Sun Devils women's track and field athletes
21st-century American women